Hagen Rether (born 8 October 1969 in Bucharest) is a Romanian-born German political cabaret artist and musician. The most remarkable features in his performance are usually the presence and use of a grand piano. He was a frequent contributor to the German Kabarett TV show Scheibenwischer.

Among the topics Rether relates to are not only federal, state and international politics, but also religion, media, consumerism and globalization.

Biography 
Hagen Rether spent his childhood in Bucharest and Sibiu, Romania as the son of German, Transylvanian Saxon parents of Siebenbürgen. In 1973, his family relocated to West Germany settling in Freiburg im Breisgau. He began studying the piano at eight years of age and attended the Folkwang Hochschule in Essen, where he still lives today (2008).

Prior to touring with his solo show, he was the pianist in Ludger Stratmann's show as well as performing with other artists. Since 2003 he has presented his show "Liebe" (en.: Love), which he constantly updates and varies according to the contemporary requirements of every performance.

His show is predominantly political. Sometimes he begins by eating a cup of yoghurt. Throughout much of the show he alternates or accompanies his monologue with the piano modifying song selection, tempo and style according to the topic he is about to cover.

Important targets for his satires and biting ironies are, among many others, the Catholic Church, George W. Bush and the German novelist and Nobel Prize winner Günter Grass, whom he criticized for not admitting that he was a member of the Waffen-SS as a teenager. Another target is German pop singer Herbert Grönemeyer, who he alleges for commercially exploiting his own wife's death in his songs.

Using parody, he targets historical and contemporary people using political and medial transcripts for his satires (e.g. Jürgen Rüttgers).

Awards and honors 
 2003
 Fohlen von Niedersachsen (en., approximately: The Lower Saxony Colt awarded by TAK Hannover)
 Tegtmeiers Erben (an award in memory of a local North Rhine-Westphalia-based persona by German comedian and cabaret artist Jürgen von Manger)
 2004
 Stuttgarter Besen in Gold
 Prix Pantheon - Jurypreis Frühreif & Verdorben (award shared with Serdar Somuncu)
 Paulaner Solo
 Tollwood-Festival München - Kleinkunstpreis
 Passauer Scharfrichterbeil
 Zeck-Kabarettpreis - Newcomer award Fresh Zeck
 2005
 Bavarian Cabaret Prize Senkrechtstarter (en. approximately: High-flyer)
 Deutscher Kleinkunstpreis Förderpreis der Stadt Mainz
 Goldener Spaten Senkrechtstarter 
 Sprungbrett (Förderpreis des Handelsblattes)
2008
 Deutscher Kleinkunstpreis in der Kategorie Kabarett
 2011
 Asteroid 233653 Rether, discovered by German amateur astronomer Rolf Apitzsch in 2008, was named in his honor. The official  was published by the Minor Planet Center on 15 June 2011.

Discography 
 2005: Liebe 
 2007: 3. Politischer Aschermittwoch 2007 
 2007: Liebe Zwei 
 2010: Liebe 3. Random House Audio, 
 2012: Liebe 4. Random House Audio, 
 2014: Liebe Fünf. Random House Audio, 
 2016: Liebe 6. Random House Audio,

References

External links 
 Homepage von Hagen Rether

1969 births
German satirists
Living people
German entertainers
Kabarettists
German cabaret performers
Transylvanian Saxon people
German people of German-Romanian descent
Entertainers from Bucharest